The BET Her Award honors motivational and empowering songs that center women. The award was first awarded in 2006 as the BET J Cool Like That Award to honor outstanding neo soul and traditional R&B artists. The name of the award was changed when the BET J channel was rebranded as Centric in 2009, and again in 2018 when Centric was rebranded as BET Her. Until 2012, artists themselves were nominated, but in 2013, BET began nominating artists with a respective song. Beyoncé and Mary J. Blige are the most awarded artists in this category with two wins.

Winners and nominees
Winners are listed first and highlighted in bold.

BET J Cool Like That Award (2006-2007)
BET J Award (2008-2009)
BET Centric Award (2010-2017)
BET Her Award (2018–present)

2000s

2010s

2020s

References

BET Awards